Star is an unincorporated community in Holt County, Nebraska, United States.

History
The founder selected the name Star for its simplicity. Star once had a post office.

References

Unincorporated communities in Holt County, Nebraska
Unincorporated communities in Nebraska